The Singleton is a British drama film, directed by Paul J. Lane. The film stars Marlon Blue, Karen Fairfax, Shane Hart, Jadey Duffield, Carl T. James and Gillian Broderick.

Plot

Cast
 Marlon Blue as Kudos
 Karen Fairfax as Alexa
 Paul J. Lane as Crimson Blake
 Jadey Duffield as Karma
 Shane Hart as Jeremiah
 Tony Fadil as Father Tom
 Trevor Clarke as Uncle
 Gillian Broderick as Sister Mary
 Sally Bosman as Nanna
 Kerry Hurst as Layla
 Carl T. James as Father Kerry
 Mark Kempson as Tim
 Alan Lambert as John
 Julie Petite as Safro
 Scott Lincoln as Father Flint
 Luis J. Rose as Scarlett
 Mark Der Ver as Barman

Filming locations
Filming took place in Devon, Plymouth, Sutton Valence, Berlin and in Málaga, Spain

Release 
The film was released on 21 December 2015.

References

External links 
 

2010s English-language films